Calectasia elegans, the elegant tinsel lily, is a species of flowering plants in the family Dasypogonaceae. It is found in Western Australia.

References

External links

 Calectasia elegans at Atlas of Living Australia

elegans
Endemic flora of Western Australia
Monocots of Australia
Plants described in 2015